Mauritiinae is a subtribe of plants in the family Arecaceae found in northern South America. Genera in the subtribe are:

Lepidocaryum
Mauritia
Mauritiella

See also 
 List of Arecaceae genera

References

External links 

 
Arecaceae subtribes